The Malayan Forum was an influential political discussion group formed in 1949 by Chinese and Malay university students. The forum held a key role in establishing the contemporary political trajectory of Singapore and Malaysia. Ideologically, the group was spurred by concerns over British colonial rule in the region.

The forum was founded in London in 1949 by Abdul Razak Hussein, who would later become the Prime Minister of Malaysia; along with Goh Keng Swee and Maurice Baker.

The forum is seen as an informal predecessor to Singapore's People's Action Party.

References

Political history of Singapore
Political history of Malaysia